The John Bland Canadian Architecture Collection is a unit of McGill University Library specializing in the conservation and curation of Canadian architectural archives. Its mandate is to document the past and present work of architects who studied or taught at the McGill University School of Architecture.

Description 
The collection was created by John Bland, then director of McGill School of Architecture, in 1974. To date, it contains more than 100 archival fonds documenting renowned Canadian architects such as Edward Maxwell, Moshe Safdie or Harold Lea Fetherstonhaugh through their correspondence, architectural drawings, plans and photographs concerning their realizations.

Architectural historian France Gagnon-Pratte used the collection in writing her 1987 book Country Houses for Montrealers, 1892-1924 : the architecture of E. and W.S. Maxwell, after which she donated her working notes and photographs.

Contents of the collection

Notes and references 

 Content in this edit is translated from the existing French Wikipedia article at Collection d'architecture canadienne; see its history for attribution.

McGill University